This is the discography of British drummer Roger Taylor.

Roger Taylor

Albums
Fun in Space (1981) – No. 18 UK
Strange Frontier (1984) – No. 30 UK
Happiness? (1994) – No. 22 UK
Electric Fire (1998) – No. 53 UK
Fun on Earth (2013) – No. 69 UK
Outsider (2021) – No. 3 UK

Compilations
The Lot (2013)
Roger Taylor: Best (2014)

Live albums
The Outsider Tour Live (2022) - No. 46 UK

Singles
1977: "I Wanna Testify" (B-side: "Turn on the TV")
1981: "Future Management" – No. 49 UK
1981: "My Country"
1981: "Let's Get Crazy" (Australia, Japan, New Zealand, USA)
1984: "Man on Fire" – No. 66 UK, No. 11 South Africa 
1984: "Strange Frontier" – No. 98 UK
1984: "Beautiful Dreams" (Portugal)
1994: "Nazis 1994" – No. 22 UK
1994: "Foreign Sand" - with Yoshiki – No. 26 UK
1994: "Happiness" – No. 32 UK
1998: "Pressure On" – No. 45 UK
1999: "Surrender" – No. 38 UK
2009: "The Unblinking Eye (Everything Is Broken)"
2011: "Dear Mr Murdoch 2011"
2013: "Sunny Day" (promo)
2017: "Journey's End"
2018: "Christmas In Love" (With ZoaK)
2019: "That's Football" (With Petr Cech)
2019: "Gangsters Are Running This World"
2020: "Isolation"
2021: "We're All Just Trying to Get By" (With KT Tunstall)

Video
1998: Live at the Cyberbarn

The Cross

Albums
1988: Shove it
1990: Mad, Bad and Dangerous to Know
1991: Blue Rock

Compilations
The Lot (2013)
 Best (2014)

Singles
1987: "Cowboys and Indians" - UK #74
1988: "Shove It" - UK #83
1988: "Heaven for Everyone" - UK #84
1988: "Manipulator"
1990: "Power to Love" - UK #83
1990: "Liar"
1990: "Final Destination"
1991: "New Dark Ages"
1991: "Life Changes" (Germany only, withdrawn)

Other

The Reaction

Smile

Larry Lurex

Both songs are also part of the box set Freddie Mercury - The Solo Collection (2000) and the compilation album Lover of Life, Singer of Songs - The Very Best of Freddie Mercury Solo (2006).

Collaborations and guest appearances

References

Discographies of British artists
Rock music discographies